Frank Donald Goulden (1909–1976) was an international speedway rider from England.

Speedway career 
In 1929 and 1930, Goulden was a leading rider for the Southampton Saints and helped them finish runner-up in the Southern League, during consecutive seasons. When the new National League was created in 1932, he joined the Plymouth Tigers and stayed with them until the end of the 1933 season. In 1934, he joined West Ham Hammers, in exchange for Tiger Hart.

In 1932, he was selected for England for he first time, and then made regular appearances at international level until 1938.

He returned to Southampton in 1936 and topped the averages during the 1937 Provincial Speedway League. From 1937 to 1940 he was the Southampton captain. In 1948, he helped coach the Plymouth Devils.

Players cigarette cards
Goulden is listed as number 14 of 50 in the 1930s Player's cigarette card collection.

References 

1909 births
1976 deaths
British speedway riders
Southampton Saints riders
Plymouth Devils riders
West Ham Hammers riders